Die Lugners  is an Austrian television series about Richard Lugner and his family.

See also
List of Austrian television series

External links
 

Austrian television series
2002 Austrian television series debuts
2000s Austrian television series
2010s Austrian television series
German-language television shows